The Mother Club Fall Curling Classic is an annual bonspiel on the men's and women's curling tour. It is held annually in late September at the Granite Curling Club in Winnipeg. 

The purse for the event is $7,600.

Past champions

Men's

Women's

References

External links
Event site

Curling competitions in Winnipeg
2014 establishments in Manitoba